The Lotte Championship is a women's professional golf tournament on the LPGA Tour. It debuted in April 2012 at the Ko Olina Golf Club in Kapolei, Hawaii.

The title sponsor of the tournament is Lotte, an industrial conglomerate based in South Korea and Japan. The presenting sponsor from 2012 to 2014 was J Golf, a Korean broadcaster. In 2012, the LPGA Lotte Championship was one of two LPGA tournaments in the United States presented by J Golf. From 2015 to 2018, the presenting sponsor was Hershey.

Ai Miyazato won the inaugural event in 2012 by four strokes for her eighth win on the LPGA Tour.

In 2022, the tournament moved to the Hoakalei Country Club in ʻEwa Beach, Hawaii.

To accommodate Korean television, the tournament begins on Wednesday and concludes on Saturday.

Tournament names
2012–2014: LPGA Lotte Championship Presented by J Golf
2015: LPGA Lotte Championship Presented by Hershey
2016–2018: Lotte Championship Presented by Hershey
2019–2021: Lotte Championship
2022: Lotte Championship Presented by Hoakalei

Winners

Tournament records

References

External links

Coverage at the LPGA Tour's official website
Ko Olina Resort

LPGA Tour events
Golf in Hawaii
Recurring sporting events established in 2012
2012 establishments in Hawaii